Marina Vladimirovna Kislova (born 7 February 1978 in Leningrad) is a Russian sprinter.

International competitions

Personal bests
100 metres - 11.09 (2001)
200 metres - 22.99 (2000)

References

1978 births
Living people
Russian female sprinters
Olympic female sprinters
Olympic athletes of Russia
Athletes (track and field) at the 2000 Summer Olympics
World Athletics Championships athletes for Russia
World Athletics Championships medalists
Russian Athletics Championships winners
Athletes from Saint Petersburg